Jordanita syriaca is a moth of the family Zygaenidae. It is found in Syria, Lebanon and Israel.

The length of the forewings is 10.4–11 mm for males and about 10.5 mm for females.

References

C. M. Naumann, W. G. Tremewan: The Western Palaearctic Zygaenidae. Apollo Books, Stenstrup 1999, 

Procridinae
Insects of Turkey
Moths described in 1937